Gerd Meyer (born 5 October 1963) is a German lightweight rower. He won a gold medal at the 1987 World Rowing Championships in Copenhagen with the lightweight men's four.

References

1963 births
Living people
German male rowers
World Rowing Championships medalists for West Germany